Kobayashi Station may refer to:
 Kobayashi Station (Chiba) on the Narita Line in Inzai, Chiba, Japan
 Kobayashi Station (Miyazaki) on the Kitto Line in Kobayashi, Miyazaki, Japan